Joseph Davison (6 July 1897 – 1965) was an English professional footballer. He played as a full back in the Football League for Middlesbrough, Portsmouth and Watford.

Born in Byers Green, Davison started his working life doing national service, during and after the First World War. Once he was demobbed, he signed as a professional for Middlesbrough, where he remained for four years. He joined Portsmouth in 1923, and was appointed captain. In 1923–24, Davison's first season at the club, Portsmouth won promotion from the Third Division South as champions. In 1926–27, Portsmouth finished second in the Second Division, winning promotion to the First Division. However, Davison was released at the end of that season, and joined Watford on a free transfer. He made 147 appearances for Watford in all competitions, scoring two goals. He retired from football at the end of the 1931–32 season.

References

1897 births
1965 deaths
People from Byers Green
Footballers from County Durham
English footballers
Association football fullbacks
English Football League players
Middlesbrough F.C. players
Portsmouth F.C. players
Watford F.C. players